Atlantic Academy is a secondary free school situated in Bucks Cross in Bideford, Devon, England. It has 131 pupils as of June 2017, and its current principal is Lynsey Slater. Jordan Kelly, the school's former principal, left in November 2017 for unknown reasons.

Establishment 
The school was founded as Route 39 Academy in 2011 by local parents and was established as a state school in September 2013.

School site 
The school was temporarily situated in Clovelly Primary School's former building in Higher Clovelly. It relocated to new purpose-built premises with a 700 pupil capacity in Steart Farm, Bideford in September 2018. Plans to build the new site in this location were initially rejected by Torridge District Council; however, the decision was overruled in February 2016.

Ofsted and rebranding 
The school was first inspected as Route 39 Academy by Ofsted in May 2015, which concluded it 'Requires Improvement' although some areas were rated 'Good'. A subsequent inspection in June 2017 however graded it as 'Inadequate' in all areas. The school also attracted criticism for deciding not to enter any of its Year 11 pupils for GCSE examinations in 2017, deeming the cohort "neither academically ready nor sufficiently mature or resilient" to take them.

Following the 2017 report and former principal Jordan Kelly's unexplained departure later that year, the Launceston College Multi Academy Trust assisted with the running of the school to raise standards. In April 2018 it was revealed that all of the school's governors had resigned.

The school was renamed to Atlantic Academy at the start of the 2018/19 school year, and remains part of the Launceston College Multi Academy Trust.

References

Educational institutions established in 2013
Free schools in England
Secondary schools in Devon
2013 establishments in England